Anatoli Nikolayevich Porkhunov (28 July 1928 – 1 June 1992) was a Soviet football player. He was part of the Soviet Union's squad for the 1956 Summer Olympics, but he did not play in any matches.

Honours
 Soviet Cup winner: 1955.

International career
Porkhunov made his debut for USSR on 21 August 1955, in a friendly against West Germany.

References

External links
  Profile

1928 births
1992 deaths
Russian footballers
Soviet footballers
Soviet Union international footballers
PFC CSKA Moscow players
FC Lokomotiv Moscow players
Association football defenders